Leonard William Baker (13 September 1918 – 8 July 2008) was a British ice hockey player. He competed in the men's tournament at the 1948 Winter Olympics.

References

External links
 

1918 births
2008 deaths
English ice hockey players
Ice hockey players at the 1948 Winter Olympics
Olympic ice hockey players of Great Britain
People from Rochester, Kent